Johann Leopold Hay (22 April 1735, Fulnek – 1 June 1794, Chrast) was Bishop of Hradec Králové from 11 December 1780 until his death.

References

1735 births
1794 deaths
People from Fulnek
Roman Catholic bishops